Soyez les bienvenus or L'Autocar en folie is a 1953 French comedy film by Pierre-Louis.

Plot
The leading coach the company of Jean Nohain make a program fails in a small village. The people immobilize the troops to force him to do the show there.

Cast

Songs

Production
The composer of the music of the film Henri Betti plays his own role. During a scene, there is an orchestra that plays the melody of the songs C'est si bon and Mais qu’est-ce que j’ai ? (1947).

The song Le Beau Pedro was used in the film His Father's Portrait directed by André Berthomieu the same year.

References

External links

1953 films
French comedy films
French black-and-white films
1953 comedy films
1950s French films